is a municipality in Innlandet county, Norway. It is located in the traditional district of Gudbrandsdal. The administrative centre of the municipality is the village of Vålebru (the village is also known as Ringebu).

The  municipality is the 85th largest by area out of the 356 municipalities in Norway. Ringebu is the 195th most populous municipality in Norway with a population of 4,385.

General information
The prestegjeld of Ringebu was established as a municipality on 1 January 1838 (see formannskapsdistrikt law). In 1864, the northern part of Ringebu (population: 386) was separated to become the new municipality of Sollia. (In 1890, Sollia switched from Oppland county to Hedmark county.) On 1 January 1899, an unpopulated part of Ringebu (in Oppland county) was transferred to the neighboring municipality of Sollia (in Hedmark county).

Name
The municipality (and parish) was named after the old Ringebu farm ( or ) since this was the site of the old Ringebu Stave Church. The last element is bú which means "rural district".

Coat of arms
The coat of arms was granted in 1992. The arms show three orange flames on a red background. This represents the municipality's three valleys and three parishes: Ringebu, Fåvang, and Venabygd. Fire was chosen to represent the need for heat and light by all people.

Churches
The Church of Norway has three parishes within the municipality of Ringebu. It is part of the Sør-Gudbrandsdal prosti (deanery) in the Diocese of Hamar.

History

The stave church at Ringebu was built around the year 1220 and it is one of fewer than 30 surviving stave churches in Norway and is one of the largest.

Dale-Gudbrand is mentioned in the Heimskringla by Snorri Sturluson. The account of King Olaf's (A.D. 1015-1021) conversion of Dale-Gudbrand to Christianity is popularly recognized.

Geography

Ringebu is bordered to the west by Sør-Fron municipality, to the southwest by Gausdal municipality, to the southeast by Øyer municipality, and to the east and north by Stor-Elvdal municipality.

From Ringebu, two mountain passes provide road access into the Østerdal valley to the northeast; one of these is closed during the winter. Because these mountain areas reliably provide good snow conditions, the area is a popular tourist destination. The Kvitfjell ski area in Ringebu was expanded to serve as a downhill venue for the 1994 Winter Olympics.

Government
All municipalities in Norway, including Ringebu, are responsible for primary education (through 10th grade), outpatient health services, senior citizen services, unemployment and other social services, zoning, economic development, and municipal roads.  The municipality is governed by a municipal council of elected representatives, which in turn elects a mayor.  The municipality falls under the Vestre Innlandet District Court and the Eidsivating Court of Appeal.

Municipal council
The municipal council  of Ringebu is made up of 21 representatives that are elected to four year terms.  The party breakdown of the council is as follows:

Mayors
The mayors of Ringebu:

1838–1853: Vilhelm Fegth 	
1854–1871: Nils Iversen Elstad
1872–1873: Nils Johannessen Jevne 	
1874–1877: John Kristiansen Mæhlum 	
1878–1881: Ole Chr. Elstad 	
1882–1883: Nils Iversen Elstad 	
1884–1893: Ole Chr. Elstad (H)
1894–1897: Simen Kolstad (V)
1898-1899: Ole Chr. Elstad (H)
1899–1910: Simen Kolstad (AD)
1911–1913: Jon Nordrum (H)
1914–1925: Simen Kolstad (AD)
1926–1928: Einar Vestad (Sp)
1929–1934: Johan Hustveit (AD)
1935–1937: Einar Vestad (Sp)
1938–1941: Johan Hustveit (AD)
1942–1945: Sigurd Mytting (NS)
1945–1959: Asbjørn Haug (Ap)
1960–1967: Ole Ringen (V)
1968–1985: Birger Sæther (Ap)
1985–1995: Erik S. Winther (Ap)
1996–2007: Anders A. Fretheim (Sp)
2007–2011: Arnhild Baukhol (Ap)
2011–2015: Erik Odlo (Sp)
2015–present: Arne Fossmo (Ap)

Sister cities
Ringebu has sister city agreements with the following places:
  - Filipstad, Värmland County, Sweden

Notable people 
 Frederik Petersen (1759 in Ringebu – 1825) a Norwegian painter of portraits
 Jehans Nordbu (1768 in Ringebu — ca.1860) a Norwegian-American immigrant to the USA and an early settler in Texas
 Hans Engen (1912 in Ringebu – 1966) a Norwegian journalist, diplomat and politician, Norwegian ambassador to the United States from 1963 to 1966
 Emil Nyeng (born 1991) a Norwegian cross-country skier

References

External links

Municipal fact sheet from Statistics Norway *

Frya Leir Motel

 
Municipalities of Innlandet
1838 establishments in Norway